,  may refer to:

People 
 , Japanese parliament member
, alias of the perpetrator of the Kobe child murders
 , Japanese pole vaulter

Places 
 , the historical name for Dazaifu and Dazaifu, Fukuoka
 , the Japanese name for Chengdu
 , the fictional place in Kamen Rider Build

Other uses
 , a literary magazine created in 1911

See also
 , a Japanese dry landscape garden